Sing Your Worries Away is a 1942 musical film directed by A. Edward Sutherland and starring Buddy Ebsen, June Havoc, Patsy Kelly, Bert Lahr, Dorothy Lovett and Sam Levene.

Cast
 Buddy Ebsen as Tommy Jones
 Patsy Kelly as Bebe McGuire
 Bert Lahr as Chow Brewster
 June Havoc as Roxy Rochelle
 Dorothy Lovett as Carol Brewster
 Sam Levene as Smiley Clark
 Margaret Dumont as Flo Faulkner
 Alvino Rey as himself
 The King Sisters as themselves
 Don Barclay as Luke Brown (uncredited)
 Charles Middleton as Judge (uncredited)

Box office
According to RKO records the film lost $255,000.

References

External links

1942 films
American musical films
1942 musical films
Films produced by Cliff Reid
Films directed by A. Edward Sutherland
American black-and-white films
1940s American films